Khamsa (Arabic, lit. "five") may refer to:

 Hamsa, a popular amulet in the Middle East and North Africa, also romanized as khamsa
 Al Khamsa, a bloodline for Arabian horses that traces back to five mares
 Al Khamsa (organization), a nonprofit organization in the United States that supports the breeding of Al Khamsa bloodline horses
 Khamseh, a tribal people of Iran
 Khamsa (film), a 2008 film
 Khamsa of Nizami, a quintet of five long Persian poems, such as those of Nizami Ganjavi.

See also 
 Khamsa of Nizami (British Library, Or. 12208), the manuscript of the five poems of Nezami Ganjavi
 Melikdoms of Karabakh, also known as Khamsa Melikdoms, the five Armenian Melikdoms of Karabakh, from the Middle Ages to the Early Modern Age.
 Hamsa (disambiguation)
 Khansa (disambiguation)